The Ruby Mountains Wilderness is a protected wilderness area in the Ruby Mountains of Elko County, Nevada, United States.

Ruby Mountains Wilderness connects to the Ruby Mountains that contain hiking trails ranging between 9,000 and 10,000 feet in elevation. Hiking destinations include Seitz Canyon and the Lamoille Lake Trail.

References

External links
 
 official Humboldt-Toiyabe National Forest website
 NevadaWilderness.org
 National Atlas: Map of Humboldt-Toiyabe National Forest

Ruby Mountains
Humboldt–Toiyabe National Forest
Wilderness areas of Nevada
Protected areas of the Great Basin
Protected areas of Elko County, Nevada